Fahim Anwari is an Afghan swimmer with two Afghan national records. He is a member of Afghanistan’s national swimming team. During the COVID-19 pandemic in Afghanistan, Anwari trained at Qargha Lake. In April 2021, ANOC announced that Anwari will become the first swimmer to represent Afghanistan at the Olympics. Mohammad Fahim Anwari was given financial backing from the IOC.

Career 
In January 2021, Anwari began training at the FINA Development Centre in Kazan, Russia. In April 2021, he set two Afghan national records after being part of the FINA Development program in Kazan. At the 2020 Olympic Games, he finished 69th in the men's 50 m freestyle.

References

External links
 

1999 births
Living people
Afghan male swimmers
Swimmers at the 2020 Summer Olympics
Olympic swimmers of Afghanistan